The 1913 Illinois Fighting Illini football team was an American football team that represented the University of Illinois during the 1913 college football season.  In their first season under head coach Robert Zuppke, the Illini compiled a 4–2–1 record and finished in fifth place in the Western Conference. Fullback Enos M. Rowe was the team captain.

Schedule

References

Illinois
Illinois Fighting Illini football seasons
Illinois Fighting Illini football